Abijah Beckwith may refer to:
 Abijah Beckwith (New York politician)
 Abijah Beckwith (Wisconsin politician)